Astromula nitidum is a species of beetle in the family Cerambycidae, the only species in the genus Astromula.

References

Elaphidiini